Tosapusia bismarckeana is a species of sea snail, a marine gastropod mollusk, in the family Costellariidae, the ribbed miters.

Holotype
The holotype of the species (MNHN IM-2013-19695), measured 35.1 mm.

Type Locality : Papua New Guinea, Bismarck Sea, off Bagabag Island, PAPUA NIUGINI, station CP3979.

Distribution
This species occurs in the following locations:
 Papua New Guinea (Bismarck Sea and Solomon Sea)
 Solomon Islands
 East China Sea

References

Costellariidae
Gastropods described in 2017